Ernestina "Titina" Silá (var. Silla), (1943 – 30 January 1973) was a Bissau-Guinean member of the PAIGC. The day of her death, 30 January, is celebrated as National Women's Day in Guinea Bissau.

Guerrilla war
She is famed in Guinea Bissauan history as a martyr of the Guinea-Bissau War of Independence against Portugal, led by the PAIGC. Very young, Titina Silla joined the guerrilla war led by the charismatic Amílcar Cabral. She displayed remarkable organisational and leadership skills and became one of its most popular figures. Titina Silá was already famous within the movement in the early 1960s as an 18-year-old guerrilla leader on the North Front.

In August 1963, Silá travelled to the Soviet Union with Teodora Inácia Gomes to undertake a political internship there.

Death
She was killed in an encounter with the Portuguese military while crossing the Farim River with a group of other guerrillas. She was on her way to the funeral of Amílcar Cabral, the leader of PAIGC guerrillas, who was assassinated days earlier in Conakry (20 January 1973).  After the events of the Carnation Revolution in Lisbon and the independence of Portuguese Guinea as República da Guiné-Bissau in 1974, a monument was erected in her honour near the river Farim where she died and the date is marked as National Day of Guinean Women ("Dia Nacional da Mulher guineense") in Guinea Bissau.  Numerous places and institutions in Guinea-Bissau are named for Silá, including Praça Titina Silá in Bissau (home to government ministries and foreign missions).  Along with Cabral and Domingos Ramos, she is remembered as the most famous figures of the independence struggle.

References

Further reading 
Judy Kimble. The Struggle within the Struggle. Feminist Review, No. 8 (Summer, 1981), pp. 107–111
Stephanie Urdang. Fighting Two Colonialisms: The Women's Struggle in Guinea-Bissau.  African Studies Review, Vol. 18, No. 3, Women in Africa (Dec., 1975), pp. 29–34.

External links

 Documentos Amílcar Cabral/ Fundação Mário Soares: Lucette Cabral, Titina Silá, Osvaldo Lopes da Silva, and Maria da Luz Boal photographed at an exchange of POWs during the independence struggle, Dakar, Senegal.

1943 births
1973 deaths
African Party for the Independence of Guinea and Cape Verde politicians
Bissau-Guinean women activists
Deaths by firearm in Guinea-Bissau
People from Tombali Region
African women in war
Women in 20th-century warfare